Robert William Unser (February 20, 1934 – May 2, 2021) was an American automobile racer. At his induction into the Motorsports Hall of Fame of America in 1994, he had the fourth most IndyCar Series wins at 35 (behind his brother Al, A. J. Foyt, and Mario Andretti). Unser won the 1968 and 1974 United States Automobile Club (USAC) national championships. He won the Pikes Peak International Hill Climb overall title 10 times (13 times when class wins are included).

He was the brother of Al, Jerry Unser and Louis Unser, the father of Robby Unser and the uncle of Al Unser Jr. and Johnny Unser. The Unser family has won the Indianapolis 500 a record nine times, with Bobby and Al Unser Sr. being the only set of brothers to win in the race's history. Bobby Unser was one of ten drivers to have won the 500 three or more times and the first of two (followed by Rick Mears) to have won in three decades (1968, 1975, 1981).

Early life
Unser was born in Colorado Springs, Colorado, the son of Mary Catherine (Craven) and Jerome Henry Unser, the third oldest of four brothers. When he turned one, his family moved to Albuquerque, New Mexico where his father started a garage on U.S. Route 66. From 1953 to 1955, he served in the United States Air Force and became a top competition sharpshooter in military matches.

Racing career

Early career
Unser began racing in 1949 in a Modified at Roswell Speedway. In 1950, at the age of 15, he won his first championship in Southwest Modified Stock Cars. In 1955, Bobby and brothers Jerry and Al Unser decided to pursue racing careers in USAC. In 1959, his brother Jerry Unser died in a practice crash for the 1959 Indianapolis 500.

Pikes Peak International Hill Climb
He debuted in 1955 at Pike's Peak, dubbed "Unser's Peak" because of his family's history of success at the hill climb. He finished fifth that year, behind his two brothers. A year later, he won his first championship at Pikes Peak. He won six straight titles from 1958 to 1963. His streak ended in 1964 when his younger brother Al won the race.

He leads the all-time Pikes Peak International Hill Climb champion's list with 10 overall wins, having set a new track record eight times.  Unser's record time was broken by Michele Mouton, so Audi approached Unser asking if he would want to attempt to take the record back. In 1986, after a 12-year absence from the Pikes Peak race, he won the event for the tenth time driving an Audi Quattro. He eclipsed Mouton's time by 16 seconds. The win also broke the tie he had with his Uncle Louis Unser for nine overall victories each. The 1986 win brought Unser's total number of Pikes Peak victories to 13, including two stock car class victories (1969 and 1974) and a single sports car class win (1963).

IndyCar career
Unser came from a family of racecar drivers. He won numerous racing championships throughout his career, including three Indianapolis 500 titles. When asked in 2008 about his potential to move from midget and sprint cars, Unser said, "I never considered Indianapolis because I didn’t think I was good enough. But Rufus (Parnelli Jones) told me I was going and he got me a ride and I always be indebted to him."

Unser made his IndyCar debut in 1962 (excluding the Pikes Peak races which were part of the IndyCar season in the 1950s). He raced for Andy Granatelli between 1963 and 1965 with a Novi engine. Unser raced in his first Indianapolis 500 in 1963. He crashed early and placed 33rd. Unser's second Indianapolis 500 in 1964 ended on the second lap in the crash that killed Eddie Sachs and Dave MacDonald. Unser moved to an IndyCar owned by Bob Willke from 1966 until 1970. His first IndyCar win came in 1967 at Mosport, in Ontario. A year later, Unser won his first Indianapolis 500, setting the record as the first driver to race over 170 miles per hour at Indianapolis. In 1968, Unser worked with crew chief Jud Phillips and won his first USAC National Driving Championship with wins at Stardust International Raceway, Phoenix Raceway, Trenton Speedway, Indy, and the Pikes Peak Hill Climb.

In 1972, Unser started working for Dan Gurney's All American Racers team and a John Miller Offenhauser engine. Teams were allowed to bolt on a wing for the first time and speeds rose significantly (the previous record speed was ). Unser won nine pole positions (in ten races) and won four of the races. In 1974, he won his second USAC National Driving Championship. In 13 races, Unser won four times, took second four times, and finished in the top five twelve times. In the 1975 Indianapolis 500, he won his second 500 in a race that was rain-shortened on lap 174 because of torrential rains. Unser won twice in 1976. He remained on Gurney's team until 1979. 

From 1979 to 1981, Unser raced in the CART series for Team Penske. Roger Penske wanted a proven winner to join his young driver Rick Mears. Unser won six times to Mears' three wins but Mears won the championship and Indy 500. In 1980 he became the first driver to win the California 500 four times. Unser won four times in 1980 and finished second in the season championship to Johnny Rutherford. His career ended in 1981 following a controversial win at Indianapolis.

1981 Indianapolis 500 controversy

Unser was the center of one of the most controversial finishes in Indy 500 history at the 1981 Indianapolis 500. Unser won the pole in the No. 3 Roger Penske-owned car and led the most laps (89 laps).

On lap 149, during a caution period, Unser and Mario Andretti made their pit stop and headed back to the race. Unser passed eight cars during the caution, while Andretti passed two cars. Unser won the race by 5.18 seconds, but was stripped of it the following morning in favor of second-place finisher Andretti. Andretti drove the only other car on the lead lap at the end. After a five-month lawsuit and protest by Penske, Unser was re-awarded the win in October 1981. For his infraction, Unser was instead fined $40,000 ($ in today's money).  Unser retired during off-season testing for Pat Patrick at Phoenix.

In his autobiography Winners are Driven, Unser expressed his beliefs that the debacle was politically motivated and that USAC disqualified him (and benefited Andretti), hoping to start a falling-out between Pat Patrick, Andretti's car owner and owner of Patrick Racing, and Roger Penske (owner of Unser's car), in order to destroy CART. He claimed that Patrick's team did not protest the finish and that Patrick was on Unser's side in the controversy. For years, Unser and Andretti did not speak to each other willingly until early 2017 when Unser announced on his YouTube channel that Andretti reached out to wish him the best after Unser got extremely sick.

Other achievements
Unser was the 1975 International Race of Champions (IROC) champion and won the 1993 Fast Masters championship.

Unser challenged Dan Gurney to improve the performance of his 1971 USAC car, leading to the development of the Gurney flap. In 1993, Unser set a new Bonneville Salt Flats record at Bonneville Speedway of 223.709 in a D/Gas Modified Roadster that stood for 18 years. 

In 2003, he published a book, Winners are Driven: A Champion’s Guide to Success in Business and Life.

Broadcaster
Unser was a television broadcaster for 20 years after his retirement from racing. He was a television commentator for IndyCar races after his retirement working for NBC, ABC, and ESPN. Unser also worked as the analyst for the IMS Radio Network in 1986. In 1989, the National Academy of Television Arts and Sciences awarded ABC's telecast of the Indianapolis 500 the Sports Emmy Award for "Outstanding Live Sports Special". Unser received announcer honors with Paul Page and Sam Posey.  

Unser has announcing in the booth for his brother Al's record-tying fourth Indy 500 victory in 1987 and Al's 1985 CART championship. He also called his nephew Al Jr.'s first Indy 500 victory in the 1992 Indianapolis 500 and second in 1994.

Unser also broadcast several NASCAR events between 1986 and 1992 alongside Page and Benny Parsons. The most famous NASCAR race Unser broadcast was the 1989 The Winston in which Rusty Wallace won by wrecking Darrell Waltrip with 2 laps to go; Unser was the first broadcaster of the broadcasting team to spot the post-race fist-fight between Wallace and Waltrip's pit crews.

Awards
Unser was selected as one of Sports Illustrated's "Top Five Athletes" in the popular magazine's first twenty years, along with the Martini & Rossi and Olsonite "Driver of the Year" awards in 1974.
He was inducted into the Indianapolis Motor Speedway Hall of Fame in 1990. 
He was inducted into the International Motorsports Hall of Fame in 1990.
He was inducted into the National Sprint Car Hall of Fame in 1997.
He was inducted into the Colorado Sports Hall of Fame in 2011.
He was inducted into the Motorsports Hall of Fame of America in 1994.
He was presented with Indy 500 Front Row Award in 1999, for being a nine-time front row qualifier (1968, 1969, 1971, 1972, 1973, 1975, 1977, 1980, 1981).
He was selected fourth in The Greatest 33 list of Indianapolis 500 drivers in 2011.

Federal criminal charges
On December 20, 1996, in Colorado, Unser and a friend became lost while snowmobiling near Unser's New Mexico ranch. They abandoned one stuck snowmobile before a storm blinded them both. When the second snowmobile stopped working, they spent two days and nights in subzero weather before finding a barn where they were found. Both men were suffering badly, his friend was suffering from hypothermia, and Unser had vomited blood during this time.  Unser was later convicted of a Federal misdemeanor, "unlawful operation of a snowmobile within a National Forest Wilderness Area" (16 U.S.C. 551, 36 C.F.R. 261.16(a)), and was fined $75. Maximum penalties could have been up to six months in jail and up to $5,000.00 in fines. Unser appealed, claiming to have been lost before the accident, but the court ruled that maps were widely available and it was a public welfare offense, thus intent was not necessary. Unser appealed this decision all the way to the U.S. Supreme Court, but his writ of certiorari was denied.

Death
Unser died on May 2, 2021, at the age of 87 at his home in Albuquerque, New Mexico from natural causes. Page spoke at his funeral service; Andretti and Roger Penske spoke via videotape. Pallbearers outside of the Unser family include Willy T. Ribbs, Johnny Rutherford, and Rick Galles. He was interred at Sunset Memorial Park.

Unser was the father of two sons, Bobby Jr. and Robby, and two daughters, Cindy and Jeri. Unser coached Robby for the 1998 and 1999 Indianapolis 500. Bobby Unser Jr., who participated in racing before giving it up to pursue stunt car driving, music, and horse breeding, died less than two months after his father at the age of 65, as a result of complications from hip surgery.

Racing record

American open-wheel racing results
(key) (Races in bold indicate pole position)

Complete USAC Championship Car results

CART

Indianapolis 500 results

Indy 500 qualifying results

Complete Formula One World Championship results
Unser participated in two Formula One World Championship Grands Prix.

(key)

NASCAR
(key) (Bold – Pole position awarded by qualifying time. Italics – Pole position earned by points standings or practice time. * – Most laps led.)

Grand National Series

Winston Cup Series

Daytona 500

References

External links

 
 Bobby Unser Photos
 The Greatest 33
 

1934 births
2021 deaths
American Formula One drivers
American people of Swiss-German descent
Bonneville 200 MPH Club members
BRM Formula One drivers
Champ Car champions
Champ Car drivers
Indianapolis 500 drivers
Indianapolis 500 polesitters
Indianapolis 500 winners
International Motorsports Hall of Fame inductees
International Race of Champions drivers
Military personnel from Colorado
NASCAR drivers
National Sprint Car Hall of Fame inductees
Racing drivers from Albuquerque, New Mexico
Sportspeople from Colorado Springs, Colorado
Racing drivers from Colorado
United States Air Force airmen
World Sportscar Championship drivers
Unser family
Team Penske drivers
USAC Stock Car drivers